The 2012–13 winter transfer window for English football transfers opened on 1 January and will close on 31 January. Additionally, players without a club may join at any time, clubs below Premier League level may sign players on loan at any time, and clubs may sign a goalkeeper on an emergency loan if they have no registered goalkeeper available. This list includes transfers featuring at least one Premier League or Football League Championship club which were completed after the end of the summer 2012 transfer window and before the end of the 2012–13 winter window.

Transfers

All players and clubs without a flag are English. Note that while Cardiff City and Swansea City are associated with the Welsh flag, they play in the Championship and the Premier League (of England) respectively, and so transfers related to them and another non-English club are included.

References

Specific

Transfers Winter 2012-13
Winter 2012-13
English